World Through Your Eyes is an album of Christian music by Reuben Morgan released in Australia in November 2004 and in the United States in September 2005. The American version differs from the Australian release, with extra tracks and remastered versions of songs from the original release.

Track listing
Australian Release
 [++] (Introduction) – 0:30
 "World Through Your Eyes" – 4:00
 "Stand" – 3:51
 [++] (Transition) – 0:28
 "The Fear" – 3:12
 "Gloria" – 4:10
 "All I Am" – 4:39
 "Waterfall" – 4:15
 [++] (Transition) – 0:36
 "Christ Divine" – 4:31
 "Keep Me" – 3:37
 "Shine" – 4:09
 "In Over My Head" – 4:18
 "Waiting Here" – 4:44

US Release
 "My Redeemer Lives" – 3:21
 "Hear Our Praises" – 3:47
 "All the Heavens" – 3:47
 "I Give You My Heart" – 3:45
 "Waterfall" – 4:16
 "All I Am" – 4:17
 "Stand" – 3:52
 "The Fear" – 3:12
 "World Through Your Eyes" – 3:40
 "Gloria" – 3:52
 "Waiting Here" – 4:39

See also
 Extravagant Worship: The Songs of Reuben Morgan

References

2004 albums
Reuben Morgan albums